The 1993 McDonald's Open took place at the Olympiahalle in Munich, Germany.

Participants

Games

Final standings

Sources
Barkley MVP

External links
NBA International Pre-Season and Regular-Season Games
List of champions at a-d-c

1993–94
1993–94 in American basketball
1993–94 in French basketball
1993–94 in Spanish basketball
1993–94 in German basketball
1993–94 in Italian basketball
1993–94 in Brazilian basketball
International basketball competitions hosted by Germany